Keith Ollivierre (born 13 April 1971) is a Vincentian football coach. He served as the Saint Vincent and the Grenadines Football Federation's technical director and head coach in 2016. However, he was lambasted for assuming those two roles at the same time.

Undertaking the role of the Saint Vincent and the Grenadines head coach ahead of the 2017 Caribbean Cup qualification second round, his team were knocked out of the competition after losing to the Saint Kitts and Nevis by one goal. After the match, Ollivierre lamented his charges' wastefulness and claimed they should have advanced further. Head coach of the Vincy Heat in their 2018 FIFA World Cup qualifying campaign as well, he managed his team in two straight losses, losing 6-0 to the United States and 9-3  to Guatemala.

References

Saint Vincent and the Grenadines footballers
Saint Vincent and the Grenadines international footballers
Association football defenders
Saint Vincent and the Grenadines football managers
Saint Vincent and the Grenadines national football team managers
Living people
1971 births
1996 CONCACAF Gold Cup players